Anguilla fielded two competitors at the 2009 World Championships in Athletics held in Berlin.

Team selection

Track and road events

Field and combined events

Results

Men

Women

References

External links
Official competition website

Nations at the 2009 World Championships in Athletics
World Championships in Athletics
Anguilla at the World Championships in Athletics